Thunder in My Heart is the fifth album by the English singer-songwriter, Leo Sayer, and was released in 1977. In 2006, a remixed dance version of the track, entitled "Thunder in My Heart Again", was released, credited to Meck featuring Leo Sayer. It reached No. 1 in the United Kingdom, and No. 16 in Australia.  Along with a follow-up single, "Easy to Love", the song reached the Top 40 in the US and Canada.

Track listing

Side one
"Thunder in My Heart" (Leo Sayer, Tom Snow) – 3:37
"Easy to Love" (Sayer, Albert Hammond) – 3:43
"Leave Well Enough Alone" (Kerry Chater, Snow) – 3:15
"I Want You Back" (Sayer, Hammond) – 4:28
"It's Over" (Sayer, Snow) – 3:48

Side two
"Fool for Your Love" (Sayer, Michael Omartian) – 3:26
"World Keeps on Turning" (Sayer, Omartian) – 3:25
"There Isn't Anything" (John Vastano) – 3:14
"Everything I've Got" (Snow, Vastano) – 2:39
"We Can Start All Over Again" (Sayer, Bruce Roberts, Snow) – 3:38

Personnel

Musicians
Leo Sayer – guitar, harmonica, vocals
David Paich – piano, keyboards
Ben Adkins – bass guitar
Jack Ashford – percussion
Larry Carlton – guitar
Lenny Castro – conductor, congas
Jay Graydon – guitar
Bobbye Hall – percussion, tabla
Pat Henderson – background vocals
David Hungate – bass guitar
Bobby Kimball – background vocals
Clydie King – background vocals
Abraham Laboriel – bass guitar
Becky Lewis – vocals, background vocals
Sherlie Matthews – vocals
Ira Newborn – guitar, rhythm guitar
James Newton Howard – keyboards
Michael Omartian – piano, keyboards
Ray Parker Jr. – guitar
Jeff Porcaro – drums
Petsye Powell – background vocals
Lee Ritenour – guitar
Tom Scott – saxophone
Tom Snow – piano
James Stroud – drums, synthesizer
Fred Tackett – guitar

Production
Record producer: Richard Perry

Charts

References

External links
 

1977 albums
Albums produced by Richard Perry
Chrysalis Records albums
Leo Sayer albums
Warner Records albums